Lincoln City Football Club, an English association football club based in Lincoln, Lincolnshire, was founded in 1884, and first entered the FA Cup in the 1884–85 season. When nationally organised league football in England began, the club joined the Combination, a league set up to provide organised football for those clubs not invited to join the Football League which was to start the same year. When that league folded, Lincoln became one of the founder members of the Midland League, and won the inaugural league title. They then spent a year in the Football Alliance before being elected to the newly formed Second Division of the Football League. Lincoln moved in and out of the Football League until they became founder members of the Football League Third Division North in 1921. They remained in the Football League until 1987, when they became the first club to suffer automatic relegation to the Football Conference. They returned to the League after just one season, remained at that level until they were again relegated in 2011, and returned once more in 2017.

All players who have made at least 100 appearances in senior first-team matches for Lincoln City, in league or cup competition, are listed below. Grant Brown holds the record for Lincoln City appearances, having played 491 matches between 1989 and 2002, of which 407 were in the Football League. Tony Emery is the only other Lincoln player with more than 400 Football League appearances, and he and Dave Smith the only other two with 400 competitive appearances in total. The goalscoring record is held by Andy Graver, with 143 league goals, and 150 in total, scored over three spells with the club between 1950 and 1961. Johnny Campbell is the only other Lincoln player to have scored 100 Football League goals. Goalkeeper David Felgate is the only man in this appearance range to have played senior international football while with Lincoln City; he received his only cap for Wales as a half-time substitute for Neville Southall in a friendly against Romania in 1983.

Key

Players with 100 or more appearances

See also
 List of Lincoln City F.C. players (25–99 appearances)

Footnotes

Player statistics include games played while on loan from:

References
General
 Appearances and goals up to and including the 2012–13 season from individual player pages linked from the alphabetical list at the Lincoln City FC Archive:  Although this site is partly subscription-based, only free-access sections are used for reference. If pop-up login dialogue boxes appear, press the "Cancel" button to proceed.
 Appearances and goals from the 2013–14 to 2016–17 seasons referenced individually to player pages at the Soccerway website
 Appearances and goals from the 2017–18 season onwards referenced to Lincoln City's squad statistics at Soccerbase: 
 Wartime appearances: 
 Playing position (pre-1940 players): 
 Playing position (post-1940 players): 
 Playing position (post-2010 players): 

Specific

Players
 
Lincoln City
Association football player non-biographical articles